Osmo Juhani Lares (born 30 September 1926 Tampere) is a Finnish diplomat. He is Master of Laws. He has served as Ambassador to Tokyo from 1972 to 1978, Head of the Legal Department of the Ministry for Foreign Affairs from 1978 to 1983, Ambassador to Canberra 1983–1987 and at The Hague (the Netherlands) 1987–1989.

References 

Ambassadors of Finland to Japan
Ambassadors of Finland to Australia
Ambassadors of Finland to the Netherlands
People from Tampere
1926 births
Living people